The 1920 Big Ten Conference football season was the 25th season of college football played by the member schools of the Big Ten Conference (also known as the Western Conference) and was a part of the 1920 college football season.

The 1920 Ohio State Buckeyes football team, under head coach John Wilce, compiled a 7–0 record in the regular season, won the Big Ten championship, and lost to California in the 1921 Rose Bowl. Halfback Gaylord Stinchcomb and guard Iolas Huffman were  consensus first-team All-Americans.

The 1920 Wisconsin Badgers football team, under head coach John R. Richards, compiled a 6–1 record and finished in second place in the Big Ten. Tackle Ralph Scott was a consensus first-team All-American. End Frank Weston and center George Bunge also received first-team All-American honors from at least one selector.

End Chuck Carney of Illinois was the Big Ten's fourth consensus first-team All-American. Iowa led the conference in scoring offense (20.3 points per game), and Michigan led the conference in scoring defense (3.0 points allowed per game).

Season overview

Results and team statistics

Key
PPG = Average of points scored per game; team with highest average in bold
PAG = Average of points allowed per game; team with lowest average in bold

Regular season

September 25
On September 25, 1920, only one Big Ten team saw action.
 Indiana 47, Franklin 0

October 2
On October 2, 1920, the Big Ten football teams participated in one conference game and five non-conference games.  The non-conference games all resulted in victories, giving the Big Ten a 6–0 non-conference record to that point in the season. Chicago, Illinois, and Michigan had bye weeks.
 Iowa 14, Indiana 7 
 Ohio State 55, Ohio Wesleyan 0
 Wisconsin 60, Lawrence 0 
 Northwestern 14, Knox 0
 Purdue 10, DePauw 0
 Minnesota 41, North Dakota 3

October 9
On October 9, 1920, the Big Ten teams participated in two conference games and six non-conference games. The non-conference games resulted in six victories, giving the Big Ten a 12–0 non-conference record to that point in the season.
 Northwestern 17, Minnesota 0
 Chicago 20, Purdue 0	
 Ohio State 37, Oberlin 0
 Wisconsin 27, Michigan Agricultural 0
 Indiana 24, Mississippi State 0
 Illinois 41, Drake 0
 Iowa 63, Cornell 0
 Michigan 35, Case 0

October 16
On October 16, 1920, the Big Ten teams participated in four conference games and two non-conference games. The non-conference games resulted in two victories, giving the Big Ten a 14–0 non-conference record to that point in the season.
 Ohio State 17, Purdue 0
 Wisconsin 27, Northwestern 7
 Minnesota 21, Indiana 7
 Illinois 20, Iowa 3
 Michigan 35, Michigan Agricultural 0
 Chicago 41, Wabash 0

October 23
On October 23, 1920, the Big Ten teams participated in four conference games.  Northwestern and Purdue had bye weeks.
 Ohio State 13, Wisconsin 7
 Illinois 7, Michigan 6
 Indiana 21, Minnesota 7
 Chicago 10, Iowa 0

October 30
On October 30, 1920, the Big Ten teams participated in three conference games and two non-conference games. The non-conference games resulted in two victories, giving the Big Ten a 16–0 non-conference record to that point in the season. Iowa and Wisconsin had bye weeks.
 Ohio State 7, Chicago 6
 Indiana 10, Northwestern 7
 Illinois 17, Minnesota 7
 Michigan 21, Tulane 0
 Purdue 19, Wabash 14

November 6
On November 6, 1920, the Big Ten teams participated in four conference games and one non-conference game. The non-conference game resulted in a loss to Notre Dame, giving the Big Ten a 16–1 non-conference record to that point in the season. Indiana had a bye week.
 Ohio State 14, Michigan 7
 Wisconsin 3, Minnesota 0
 Illinois 3, Chicago 0	
 Iowa 20, Northwestern 0
 Notre Dame 28, Purdue 0

November 13
On November 13, 1920, the Big Ten teams participated in four conference games and one non-conference game. The non-conference game resulted in a second loss to Notre Dame, giving the Big Ten a 16–2 non-conference record to that point in the season. Ohio State had a bye week.
 Wisconsin 14, Illinois 9
 Michigan 14, Chicago 0
 Iowa 28, Minnesota 7 
 Northwestern 14, Purdue 0
 Notre Dame 13, Indiana 10

November 20
On November 20, 1920, the Big Ten teams participated in four conference games and two non-conference games. The non-conference games resulted in a win and a loss, giving the Big Ten a 17–3 non-conference record for the regular season. All three losses were against Notre Dame. 
 Ohio State 7, Illinois 0
 Wisconsin 3, Chicago 0
 Indiana 10, Purdue 7
 Michigan 3, Minnesota 0
 Iowa 14, Iowa State 10
 Notre Dame 33, Northwestern 7

Bowl games

On January 1, 1921, at Tournament Park in Pasadena, California, Ohio State lost to national champion California by a 28–0 score. California remained undefeated from 1920 until 1924.

Awards and honors

All-Big Ten players

The following players were selected as first-team players on the 1920 All-Big Ten Conference football team by E. C. Patterson for Collier's Weekly (ECP), Malcolm McLean, or Walter Eckersall of the Chicago Tribune (WE). It also includes players listed as members of the 1920 "All-Conference Team" as published in the "ESPN Big Ten Football Encyclopedia" (BTFE).

All-Americans

Four Big Ten players were selected as consensus first-team players on the 1920 College Football All-America Team. They were:

Other Big Ten players received first-team honors from at least one selector. They were:

References